Past Lovers (Italian: Amanti del passato) is a 1953 Italian melodrama film that was directed by Adelchi Bianchi and starring Lia Amanda, Vittorio Sanipoli and Irene Genna.

Main cast 
Lia Amanda as Anna
Vittorio Sanipoli as Carlo
Irene Genna as Roberta
Lauro Gazzolo as Servitore
Michele Malaspina as Count Bernardo
Gino Leurini 
Mirko Ellis 
Nino Milano

References

External links

1953 films
1953 romantic drama films
Italian romantic drama films
Films directed by Adelchi Bianchi
1950s Italian-language films
Italian black-and-white films
Melodrama films
1950s Italian films